Andrés Nicolás "Nico" Olivera Olivera (born 30 May 1978) is a Uruguayan former footballer who played as a forward.

He started and finished his 20-year professional career with Defensor, going on to collect 500 league appearances mainly in the top divisions in Uruguay, Spain and Mexico. This included a spell with Sevilla, for whom he signed in 1998.

Olivera won 28 caps for the Uruguay national team, being part of the squads at the 2002 World Cup as well as the 1997 Confederations Cup.

Club career
After excelling as a youngster at his first professional club, Defensor Sporting Club, Montevideo-born Olivera moved to Spain and signed for Valencia CF, in January 1998. He was rarely used by the Che during his five-month spell, but went on to spend the vast majority of the following seven years in the country, starting off with Sevilla FC with which he achieved two La Liga promotions, in 1999 and 2001, scoring 21 goals in 56 games in those seasons combined; on 19 November 2000, during a Seville derby where his team was reduced to ten men with the score at 1–1 and 15 minutes remaining, he netted twice for the eventual 3–1 win.

In 2002, Olivera left Andalusia and joined fellow league side Real Valladolid. After one single season he returned to Segunda División and signed with Córdoba CF, returning to Defensor afterwards.

Olivera then played five months with another Spanish team Albacete Balompié (only four games, top division relegation), returning subsequently to his previous club. In 2006 the 28-year-old moved to Mexico, going on to represent five sides in the country, including Puebla F.C. twice.

On 1 August 2010, in a Primera División match against Club San Luis, Olivera opened the scoring within a few seconds, after knocking in a rebound from Mario Ortiz's speculative shot in an eventual 2–1 home win.

International career
Olivera played all the games for Uruguay at the 1997 FIFA World Youth Championship held in Malaysia, scoring two goals in an eventual second-place finish and being named the competition's best player. Also that year, on 13 December, he made his full side debut, during the FIFA Confederations Cup, against United Arab Emirates, and scored in a 2–0 group stage win.

Olivera was selected for the squad that appeared at the 2002 FIFA World Cup in Japan and South Korea, being an unused squad member.

Personal life
In December 1999, Olivera and compatriot Sevilla teammates Marcelo Zalayeta and Marcelo Otero were charged for assaulting a man. Having struck a plea bargain, they paid €3,600 fines in March 2002 instead of facing a maximum eight-year sentence.

References

External links
 
 
 
 

1978 births
Living people
Afro-Uruguayan
Uruguayan people of Spanish descent
Footballers from Montevideo
Uruguayan footballers
Association football forwards
Uruguayan Primera División players
Defensor Sporting players
La Liga players
Segunda División players
Valencia CF players
Sevilla FC players
Real Valladolid players
Córdoba CF players
Albacete Balompié players
Liga MX players
Club Necaxa footballers
Atlas F.C. footballers
Club Puebla players
C.D. Veracruz footballers
Club América footballers
Correcaminos UAT footballers
Uruguay under-20 international footballers
Uruguay international footballers
1997 FIFA Confederations Cup players
2002 FIFA World Cup players
Uruguayan expatriate footballers
Expatriate footballers in Spain
Expatriate footballers in Mexico
Uruguayan expatriate sportspeople in Spain
Uruguayan expatriate sportspeople in Mexico